The 2010 Skyrunning World Championships was the 1st edition of the global skyrunning competition, Skyrunning World Championships, organised by the International Skyrunning Federation and was held in Italian Dolomiti from 16 to 25 July 2010.

Results

Men

Vertical Kilometer
The race took place in Canazei on 16 July 2010.

SkyMarathon
The race took place in Premana on 25 July 2010.

Women

Vertical Kilometer
The race took place in Canazei on 16 July 2010.

SkyMarathon
The race took place in Premana on 25 July 2010.

References

External links
 International Skyrunning Federation official web site

Skyrunning World Championships